Podomachla apicalis is a moth of the  family Erebidae. It is found in Angola, Cameroon, the Republic of Congo, the Democratic Republic of Congo, Equatorial Guinea, Eritrea, Ethiopia, Gabon, Ghana, Kenya, Liberia, Malawi, Mozambique, Nigeria, Sierra Leone, South Africa, São Tomé & Principe, Tanzania, Togo and Uganda.

The larvae have been recorded feeding on Asteraceae species.

References

Nyctemerina
Moths described in 1854
Moths of Sub-Saharan Africa
Moths of São Tomé and Príncipe